Dahlstedtia is a genus of flowering plants in the legume family, Fabaceae. It belongs to the subfamily Faboideae. Species are found from Central to tropical South America.

References 

Millettieae
Fabaceae genera
Taxa named by Gustaf Oskar Andersson Malme